Denny-Renton Clay and Coal Company, founded in 1892 as Denny Clay Company, was the largest producer of brick pavers in the world by 1905. An industry journal said in 1909 "The clay products of this company have long been a standard for general excellence in Seattle and the entire northwest" and described its products:

Hydraulic mining was used to extract clay from the hill. The factory produced 58 million bricks in 1917. It was closed when Taylor was condemned to become part of Seattle's Cedar River watershed in 1947.

History
The company was founded by Seattle founder Arthur A. Denny in 1892 when he bought out predecessor company Puget Sound Fire Clay Company and named it Denny Clay Company. His son Orion O. Denny, who was the first baby boy born to the settlers of Seattle, became a vice-president of the company and president in 1899 when Arthur died. It merged with Renton Brick Works and was renamed Denny-Renton Clay and Coal Company. The company was bought by Gladding, McBean in 1927 and ceased to exist as a separate operation.

Legacy in Seattle architecture

Ornamental terra cotta from the Renton factory and other local factories is found in unusual abundance in buildings in Downtown Seattle, exemplified by the 1916 Arctic Building, and the University of Washington buildings designed by Bebb and Gould. The Indian head decoration on the Cobb Building and the Henry-White-Stuart buildings (now demolished) may have used Denny-Renton terra cotta. Pike Place Market, built in 1907, is paved with Denny Renton bricks.

Renton brickworks today

The location of the former Renton brickworks is now a dog park in Renton on the Cedar River Trail, near its crossing with I-405.

References

Bibliography

External links

Museums 101: Renton History Museum (Photo Diary) By Ojibwa Sunday Aug 24, 2014 Daily Kos 
Paving the way: King County bricks built roads around the world, Black Diamond Historical Society, December 7, 2014
  

Defunct companies based in Seattle
Non-renewable resource companies disestablished in 1927
American companies established in 1892
Non-renewable resource companies established in 1892
1892 establishments in Washington (state)
1927 disestablishments in Washington (state)